Torrify may refer to:

The process of torrefaction, a type of pyrolysis
A historical name for the XeroBank Browser